Aurora Theatre Company is a professional theatre company located in Berkeley, California.

History 
The company was founded by actor and director Barbara Oliver in 1992 with the desire to continue to produce plays "about something important; ideas mediated by language and people, which are assisted by other elements like sets, lights and costumes," not dominated by them. The founders of Aurora Theatre Company came together around the development and production of a new play: Dorothy Bryant's Dear Master.

Programs 
The company produces a five play season. In addition to their regular season, they produce an annual staged reading festival known as the Global Age Project.

Location 
Aurora Theatre Company has a small, intimate performance space, and has been referred to as “chamber theatre.”

In 2001, the company moved to a dedicated custom-designed 150-seat theater in downtown Berkeley, situated immediately adjacent to the Berkeley Repertory Theatre.

Recognition 
It has won 20 awards from the Bay Area Theatre Critics Circle. Aurora received a $25,000 Wallace Alexander Gerbode Foundation award in 2000 for new play production. The San Francisco Weekly named Aurora Outstanding Bay Area Theatre Company.

They operate under a Tier 4 BAT contract with Actors' Equity Association. Currently, more than one-third of the budget is allocated to acting salaries, with Aurora Theatre Company having been commended for the high percentage of Equity actors in its productions.

List of productions that premiered at Aurora

1991–1992
Dear Master - Dorothy Bryant (world premiere)

1995–1996
The Panel - Dorothy Bryant (world premiere)

1996–1997
Gunplay - Frank Higgins (west coast premiere)

1997–1998
Abigail's Party - Mike Leigh (American premiere)
Posing for Gauguin - Dorothy Bryant (world premiere)

1998–1999
Death Defying Acts - David Mamet, May, Allen (west coast premiere)

1999–2000
Transcendental Wild Oats - LeClanche DuRand (world premiere)
Split - Mayo Simon (world premiere)

2002–2003
Alarms and Excursions - Michael Frayn (west coast premiere)
Partition - Ira Hauptman (world premiere)

2003–2004
Antigone Falun Gong - Cherylene Lee (world premiere)

2004–2005
The Persians - Aeschylus, new adaptation by Ellen McLaughlin (west coast premiere)
Emma - Michael Fry, from the novel by Jane Austen (west coast premiere)

2005–2006
Marius - Marcel Pagnol, translated by Zack Rogow (world premiere translation)
The Master Builder - Henrik Ibsen, translated by Paul Walsh (world premiere translation)
Small Tragedy - Craig Lucas (west coast premiere)

2006–2007
Ice Glen - Joan Ackermann (west coast premiere)

2007–2008
Satellites - Diana Son (west coast premiere)
The Trojan Women - Ellen McLaughlin/Euripides (professional world premiere)
The Busy World is Hushed - Keith Bunin (west coast premiere)

2008–2009
The Coverlettes Cover Christmas (world premiere)
Betrayed - George Packer (west coast premiere)
Jack Goes Boating - Bob Glaudini (bay area premiere)

2009–2010
The First Grade - Joel Drake Johnson (world premiere)
Speech & Debate - Stephen Karam (bay area premiere)

2016–2017
Safe House - Keith Josef Adkins (west coast premiere)

2017–2018
Eureka Day - Jonathan Spector (world premiere)

References

External links
 Official website

Theatre companies in Berkeley, California
1992 establishments in California
Buildings and structures in Berkeley, California
Performing groups established in 1992
Culture of Berkeley, California
Theatres in the San Francisco Bay Area
Theatre company production histories